Héctor Pedraza Olguín (born 30 August 1966) is a Mexican politician from the Institutional Revolutionary Party. From 2009 to 2012 he served as Deputy of the LXI Legislature of the Mexican Congress representing Hidalgo.

References

1966 births
Living people
Politicians from Hidalgo (state)
Institutional Revolutionary Party politicians
21st-century Mexican politicians
Academic staff of Universidad Autónoma del Estado de Hidalgo
Members of the Congress of Hidalgo
People from Ixmiquilpan
Deputies of the LXI Legislature of Mexico
Members of the Chamber of Deputies (Mexico) for Hidalgo (state)